Safi Darashah (1902 — 2 April 1988) was an Indian cricketer who played 24 first class matches.

References

1902 births
1988 deaths
Indian cricketers
Place of birth missing